Kotora is a Slovak surname. Notable people with the surname include:

 Igor Kotora (born 1989), Slovak footballer
 Ivan Kotora (born 1991), Slovak footballer

See also
 Cotora, Romanian surname

Slovak-language surnames